"No Mienten" is a song by American singer Becky G. It was released on April 20, 2022, by Kemosabe, RCA and Sony Music Latin, as the fourth single from her second Spanish studio album, Esquemas (2022).

Composition
"No Mienten" is a dance song with elements of Latin pop. It is written in the key of A♭ major, with a moderately fast tempo of 128 beats per minute.

Charts

Year-end charts

Certifications

Release history

References

2022 singles
2022 songs
Becky G songs
Spanish-language songs
Kemosabe Records singles
RCA Records singles
Sony Music Latin singles
Songs written by Becky G